Paris, Not France is a 2008 documentary film following American heiress and entertainer Paris Hilton. The 68-minute documentary chronicles Hilton's successes and struggles.

Synopsis
Cameras follow the day-to-day life of socialite Paris Hilton. Hilton discusses her lifestyle, tabloid speculations and rumors.

Release
In order to promote the film, MTV released various commercial and theatrical trailers. A special screening took place in Los Angeles on July 23, 2009 at the Majestic Crest Theater.

References

External links 
 

2008 films
Documentary films about singers
2008 documentary films
American documentary films
Documentary films about women
Paris Hilton
2000s English-language films
2000s American films